Homicide Hunter (also known as Homicide Hunter: Lt. Joe Kenda) is an American crime documentary television series which aired on the Investigation Discovery (ID) television network for nine seasons, totalling 144 episodes. The series showcases the career of retired Colorado Springs, Colorado, police department detective Joe Kenda. Kenda joined the department in 1973 and was promoted to detective in 1977 and assigned to the burglary division. However, after solving a double shooting which veteran detectives believed was unsolvable, he was assigned to the homicide division. The case was presented in the Season 4 finale "My First Case". Kenda states he solved 387 cases (other sources state he solved 356 of 387 cases). At the time of his retirement in 1996, he was the commander of the department's major crimes unit.

The cases are told by Kenda in his trademark deadpan manner, with touches of dry humor. Re-enactments feature actor and former deputy sheriff Carl Marino portraying a younger Kenda, and narration by Josh Casaubon. Episodes also featured contextual contributions by witnesses to the crimes, family and friends of the victims, members of law enforcement and the media, and others.

Homicide Hunter debuted on October 25, 2011. In May 2019, Kenda announced in a video posted on the show's official Facebook page that the ninth season of Homicide Hunter would be its last. However, he is still committed to working with Investigation Discovery.

Kenda recounted that at age nine during a visit to the Pittsburgh Zoo, he experienced what he calls an epiphany: "There was a big sign, and it read, 'Around this corner is the most dangerous animal on earth' ... and it was a mirror from ceiling to floor. Everyone was looking in the mirror, and everyone was wondering, 'Well, what is this about?'"

The ninth and final season premiered on August 28, 2019. The final episode aired on January 29, 2020.

Episodes

Season 1 (2011)

Season 2 (2012)

Season 3 (2013)

Season 4 (2014)

Season 5 (2015–16)

Season 6 (2016–17)

Season 7 (2017–18)

Season 8 (2018–19)

Season 9 (2019–20)

Ratings
On Tuesday, November 12, 2013, Investigation Discovery had its best night ever for Homicide Hunter, delivering 1.3 million viewers and ranking No. 8 in ad-supported cable programs.

On Tuesday, August 18, 2015, Investigation Discovery shattered network records with the Season 5 premiere, delivering 3.8 million viewers and making it a Top 5 cable program in its time period.

During the 2017 season, the series remained a top performer with an average of 1.9 million viewers. 

As of 2015, Homicide Hunter was airing in 183 countries.

References

2010s American documentary television series
Television shows set in Colorado
2011 American television series debuts
English-language television shows
2010s American crime television series
American non-fiction television series
Investigation Discovery original programming
True crime television series
2020 American television series endings